John Carlton Platt (born 1963) is an American computer scientist. He is currently a Distinguished Scientist at Google. Formerly he was a Deputy Managing Director at Microsoft Research Redmond Labs. Platt worked for Microsoft from 1997 to 2015. Before that, he served as director of research at Synaptics.

Life and work 
Platt was born in Elgin, Illinois and matriculated at California State University, Long Beach at the age of 14. After graduating from CSULB at the age of 18, he enrolled in a computer science PhD program at California Institute of Technology.

While a student at Caltech under astronomer Gene Shoemaker, he discovered two asteroids, 3259 Brownlee and 3237 Victorplatt at Palomar Observatory on 25 September 1984. The latter he named after his father Victor Platt, while the former was named by Gene Shoemaker. Shoemaker allowed Platt to name one of his discoveries, 3927 Feliciaplatt, which he named after his mother.

In August 2005, Apple Computer had its application for a patent on the interface of the popular iPod music player rejected by the United States Patent and Trademark Office. The reason appears to be that Platt had submitted a patent application for a similar interface design five months prior to Apple's claim.

Platt shared a 2005 Scientific and Technical Achievement Oscar from the Academy of Motion Picture Arts and Sciences with Demetri Terzopoulos for their pioneering work in physically-based computer-generated techniques used to simulate realistic cloth in motion pictures.

Platt invented sequential minimal optimization, a widely used method for training support vector machines, as well as Platt scaling, a method to turn SVMs (and other classifiers) into probability models.

References

External links
 Asteroids discovered by John Platt
 Machine Learning for Dummies

1963 births
California Institute of Technology alumni
California State University, Long Beach alumni
Discoverers of minor planets
Living people
Microsoft employees
People from Elgin, Illinois
Google employees